Borna Kapusta (born 24 July 1996) is a Croatian professional basketball player, currently playing for Cibona of the Croatian League and the ABA League.

Professional career 
At the start of season 2016–17 he moved to Zabok from Gorica, where he would reside for the next two seasons. In August 2018 he returned in Gorica.  
In January 2020, with Gorica he beat the favorite Cibona, making 6 points, 3 rebounds and 11 assist.

National team career 
Kapusta was a member of the Croatia under-18 team that took 3th place at the 2014 FIBA Europe Under-18 Championship.

In the summer of 2015, Kapusta played with the Croatia under-19 team that won the silver medal at the 2015 FIBA Under-19 World Championship held in Heraklion.

References

External links
 ABA liga Profile 
 Eurobasket.com Profile
 Fiba Profile
 REALGM Profile

1996 births
Living people
Croatian men's basketball players
Point guards
KK Cibona players
KK Gorica players
KK Zabok players